Nilab (also Romanized as Nīlāb) is a village in Jam Rural District, in the Central District of Jam County, Bushehr Province, Iran. At the 2006 census, its population was 91 people in 22 families.

References 

Populated places in Jam County